Sune Isidor "Mona-Lisa" Andersson (22 February 1921 – 29 April 2002) was a Swedish football player and manager. He is best remembered for representing AIK and A.S. Roma during his club career. A full international between 1947 and 1950, he won 28 caps and scored four goals for the Sweden national team. He was part of the Sweden teams that won gold at the 1948 Summer Olympics and finished third at the 1950 FIFA World Cup.

Club career 
Andersason was a versatile midfielder, who would take any position: left, right or center. His only domestic title was the 1949 Svenska Cupen with AIK. His performance at the 1950 World Cup earned him a transfer to A.S. Roma in Serie A, where he played for two seasons and scored 12 goals. He then continued playing and coaching in Sweden until 1971.

International career 
Andersson played 28 times for the Swedish national team, scoring four goals, and won a gold medal at the 1948 Summer Olympics, and a bronze at the 1950 FIFA World Cup.

Personal life 
Andersson was nicknamed "Mona-Lisa", because of his blunt facial expression while playing. He was also an elite bowler.

Career statistics

International 

 Scores and results list Sweden's goal tally first, score column indicates score after each Andersson goal.

Honours 
AIK

 Svenska Cupen: 1949

Sweden

 Summer Olympics: 1948

 FIFA World Cup third place: 1950

References

External links
Profile

1921 births
2002 deaths
People from Södertälje
Swedish footballers
Sweden international footballers
Swedish expatriate footballers
Expatriate footballers in Italy
Swedish expatriate sportspeople in Italy
Allsvenskan players
AIK Fotboll players
A.S. Roma players
Serie A players
Serie B players
Kalmar FF players
Olympic footballers of Sweden
Olympic gold medalists for Sweden
Footballers at the 1948 Summer Olympics
1950 FIFA World Cup players
Swedish football managers
Kalmar FF managers
Olympic medalists in football
IFK Eskilstuna players
Medalists at the 1948 Summer Olympics
Association football midfielders
Sportspeople from Stockholm County